Batley and Morley was a parliamentary constituency centred on the towns of Batley and Morley in West Yorkshire.  It returned one Member of Parliament (MP)  to the House of Commons of the Parliament of the United Kingdom.

The constituency was created for the 1918 general election, and abolished for the 1983 general election. It was then replaced by the seats of Batley and Spen & Morley and Leeds South.

Boundaries
1918–1950: The Municipal Boroughs of Batley, Morley, and Ossett.

1950–1983: The Municipal Boroughs of Batley and Morley.

Members of Parliament

Elections

Elections in the 1910s

Elections in the 1920s

Elections in the 1930s

Liberal Party candidate Ernest Dalton withdrew

Elections in the 1940s

Elections in the 1950s

Elections in the 1960s

Elections in the 1970s

References
 

Parliamentary constituencies in Yorkshire and the Humber (historic)
Constituencies of the Parliament of the United Kingdom established in 1918
Constituencies of the Parliament of the United Kingdom disestablished in 1983
History of West Yorkshire
Politics of Leeds
Politics of Kirklees